Antonín Chittussi (1 December 1847, in Ronov nad Doubravou – 1 May 1891, in Prague) was a Czech Impressionist landscape and cityscape painter.

Biography 
His father came from an Italian merchant family who lived in Ferrara and he moved to Bohemia during the Napoleonic Wars. After settling in Ronov, he married an innkeeper and later served as Mayor. At first, Antonín was expected to follow in the family business, but displayed an aptitude for art, which was noticed by his grammar school teachers in Čáslav, so he was sent to Kutná Hora where he studied drawing with František Bohumír Zvěřina.

At the age of eighteen, he went to Prague, with the intent to study engineering but, instead, he enrolled at the Academy of Fine Arts. However, he was dissatisfied with the courses being offered and went to Munich instead, but he became tired of their Academic approach. He was called to Vienna for military service, but was able to obtain a deferral, and briefly enrolled at the Academy of Fine Arts. Later, he returned to the Academy in Prague to study history painting. In 1876, he participated in a protest by Czech students against Alfred Woltmann, a Professor of art history at the University of Prague, who was accused of German chauvinism, forcing him to flee the lecture hall. Clashes between Czech and German students ensued. After a police investigation and five days in jail, Chittussi and Mikoláš Aleš, who were identified as the ringleaders, were expelled from the Academy. 

He also befriended Brauner's daughter, Zdenka, an aspiring artist who influenced Chittussi's approach by introducing him to the work of the Barbizon school. In 1877, he and František Ženíšek, a friend from school, opened a studio. It was then that he became primarily interested in landscapes.

Following the conclusion of the Russo-Turkish War in 1878, the Austro-Hungarian Army moved in to occupy Bosnia-Herzegovina and, as an army reservist, he was called up and sent to the front. The death and destruction he witnessed had a profound effect on him, which he attempted to work through emotionally by corresponding with Zdenka. He was able to make a series of small drawings and watercolors, which he exhibited on his return and, with the help of friends, succeeded in financing a trip to Paris.

The influence of Paris
He arrived in time for the "Fourth Impressionist Exhibition", but was not ready to accept what he saw. Eventually, though, he concluded that most of his earlier work had "been in vain". In 1880, he rented a small studio and began to work on absorbing the new styles. He soon gained the support of the writer Élémir Bourges, who would later marry Zdenka's sister, Anna. In 1882, he was invited to spend six months painting at the Radziwiłł estate near Ermenonville. The following year, he exhibited at the Salon. Although successful, by 1884 he was ready to return home and held an auction of his works at the Hôtel Drouot. As it turned out, this meant a cooling of his relationship with Zdenka, as she actually began to spend more time in Paris than before, pursuing her career.

He soon discovered an area in Southern Bohemia that inspired him to paint and helped him to assuage his hurt feelings. Shortly after, he settled near Člunek. In 1887, he developed health problems, which were believed to be related to the time he spent outdoors, painting during inclement weather. He gradually grew weaker and was diagnosed with tuberculosis. In an effort to stop the disease's progress, he went to the Tatra Mountains, but it was too late. In 1891, he died in Prague on the way home from treatment.

A street in the Bubeneč district there is named after him and, in 1997, the Czech government used one of his paintings (a castle in Chantilly) on a postage stamp.

References

Further reading 

 Zdeněk Sejček, Mladý Chittussi: Monografická studie o mládí a rané tvorbě umělce (Studies on the Youth and Early Formation of the Artist) Východočeské nakladatelství, 1965
 František Dvořák, Antonín Chittussi, Odeon, 1954
 Roman Prahl, Antonín Chittussi (1847 - 1891) (exhibition catalog),  Východočeská galerie v Pardubicích, 2012

External links 

 Arcadja Auctions: More works by Chittussi
 "Antonín Chittussi: Z údolí Doubravky" (Doubravky Valley) at the Národní Galerie Nikdy Nezavírá. A video from Česká televize.
 Interview with  Adriana Chittussi by Karolína Hovorková @ Deník
 Stamps of the Czech Republic, 7kč (1997) with painting by Chittussi.

1847 births
1891 deaths
People from Ronov nad Doubravou
People from the Kingdom of Bohemia
Czech people of Italian descent
Czech Impressionist painters
Cityscape artists
19th-century Czech painters
Czech male painters
19th-century deaths from tuberculosis
Burials at Vyšehrad Cemetery
Tuberculosis deaths in the Czech Republic
19th-century Czech male artists